Parliamentary elections were held in Lebowa on 11 April 1973.

Electoral system

The election was made on the basis of 40 seats. In addition, there were 60 ex officio seats.

References

1973 elections in South Africa
Elections in South African bantustans
Lebowa